Bryan De Jesus Rodriguez Guillen (born July 6, 1991) is a Dominican Republic professional baseball pitcher for the Hokkaido Nippon-Ham Fighters of Nippon Professional Baseball (NPB).

Career

San Diego Padres
On May 29, 2010, Rodriguez signed with the San Diego Padres organization as an international free agent. He made his professional debut for the DSL Padres and did not play in a game in 2011. He split the 2012 season between the rookie ball AZL Padres and the Low-A Eugene Emeralds, accumulating a 6.46 ERA in 13 appearances. In 2013, Rodriguez spent the year in Single-A with the Fort Wayne TinCaps, pitching to a 2-8 record and 3.19 ERA in 19 games. He spent the 2014 season with the High-A Lake Elsinore Storm, recording a 8-9 record and 4.16 ERA with 104 strikeouts in 149.1 innings of work. He split the 2015 season between the Double-A San Antonio Missions and the Triple-A El Paso Chihuahuas, posting a 7-16 record and 4.88 ERA in 145.2 innings pitched. He split the 2016 season between El Paso and San Antonio, pitching to a 7-13 record and 4.46 ERA in 26 appearances. Rodriguez again played for El Paso and San Antonio in 2017, registering an 8-8 record and 4.76 ERA with 68 strikeouts. On November 7, 2016, he elected free agency.

Hokkaido Nippon-Ham Fighters
On December 8, 2017, Rodriguez signed with the Hokkaido Nippon-Ham Fighters of Nippon Professional Baseball. On March 30, 2018, he made his NPB debut as the Opening Day starting pitcher. He finished the year with a 5.26 ERA in 9 games. In 2019, Rodriguez pitched to a 6-7 record and 3.25 ERA in 91.1 innings of work. On October 18, 2019, Rodriguez signed a 1-year extension to remain with the Fighters. In 2020, he posted a 2.25 ERA in 7 appearances for the Fighters. He re-signed a one year deal for the 2023 season.

International career
He was selected to the roster for the Dominican Republic national baseball team at the 2015 WBSC Premier12 and 2017 World Baseball Classic.

References

External links

1991 births
Living people
Arizona League Padres players
Hokkaido Nippon-Ham Fighters players
Dominican Republic baseball players
Dominican Republic expatriate baseball players in Japan
Dominican Republic expatriate baseball players in the United States
Dominican Republic national baseball team players
Dominican Summer League Padres players
El Paso Chihuahuas players
Eugene Emeralds players
Fort Wayne TinCaps players
Gigantes del Cibao players
Lake Elsinore Storm players
Nippon Professional Baseball pitchers
Sportspeople from San Pedro de Macorís
San Antonio Missions players
2015 WBSC Premier12 players
2017 World Baseball Classic players